Eugenio Corini (born 30 July 1970) is an Italian professional football coach and former player, currently in charge of Serie B club Palermo.

A talented, dynamic, and hard-working playmaker, known for his precise long passing, flair, and his ability to orchestrate his team's attacking moves or provide assists for teammates, Corini usually played either as an attacking midfielder or as a deep lying playmaker in midfield. A set-piece specialist, he was also known for his accuracy from free kicks, corners, and penalty kicks.

Club career 
Corini began his career in the Brescia youth squad, but by age 16 was called-up to be included in the first-team,, making his debut the following season. He became a regular for Lombardian in 1988–89 and 1989–90 seasons, before being signed by Juventus.

In his first season with Juventus, at 20, Corini played 25 times and scored one goal.

In 1992–93, Corini was sold to Sampdoria, where he made 24 appearances, and had several injury problems. In the next few years, Corini moved from team to team almost every season (Napoli, Brescia again, and Piacenza) without being able to show his full potential.

In October 1998, Verona loaned him to city rivals Chievo Verona, in Serie B. Corini soon became a mainstay of the team, leading his team as captain to an extraordinary promotion for Serie A in 2001, and 2002 FIFA World Cup qualification (UEFA), after having been first-placed at the winter break.

Corini joined Palermo in 2003, helping them win the 2003–04 Serie B league title, followed by 2006 FIFA World Cup qualification (UEFA). He later served as the club captain. In June 2007, he announced he would not renew his contract with Palermo, and a few days later he was signed by Torino, age 37. He was confirmed with the granata also for the 2008–09 season, which he stated it would be his final one as a footballer. In May 2009 Corini confirmed his retirement as a player, after he failed to recover from a recurring Achilles tendon injury which forced him to have surgery, which caused him to miss the final part of the season which saw Torino being relegated to Serie B. He also stated his intention to try himself as a head coach in the next future.

International career 
Corini became a regular also in the Italy u21 team of the early 1990s, winning a UEFA European Under-21 Championship, and representing Italy in the 1992 Summer Olympics held in Barcelona.

Despite his success for Italy at the youth levels and for various teams at club level, he has never been capped for the full national team in a career spanning almost two decades. However, he did receive call-ups during the 1992–93 season, and more recently in November 2002.

Managerial career 
After announcing his retirement, Corini confirmed his interest in becoming a coach, being successively linked on a number of vacancies in the Italian football panorama. On 5 July 2010 Eugenio Corini was unveiled as the new head coach of Portosummaga, a newly promoted 2010–11 Serie B club; he agreed to become the club's new head coach despite not having the required coaching badge qualification at the time of the appointment. He had only a UEFA A License, so UEFA Pro graduate Salvatore Giunta would work alongside him.

Unexpectedly, Corini left the club twelve days later, together with director of football Giuseppe Magalini, due to disagreements with the board regarding the transfer market policy and the future plans for the team.

On 27 November 2010 he was appointed head coach of Serie B club Crotone, replacing Leonardo Menichini. His experience with the Calabrian club turned out to be short-lived, as he was dismissed later on 20 February 2011 following a string of poor results that left Crotone in danger of relegation.

From 30 November 2011 through the end of the season he coached Frosinone in Lega Pro Prima Divisione in place of the resigned Carlo Sabatini.

On 2 October 2012 he was named new head coach of Chievo in place of Domenico Di Carlo, after the team suffered five consecutive defeats in the first six games of the season. Corini and Chievo parted ways on 29 May 2013 by mutual consent; only for Corini to return to Chievo 4 months later, appointed on 12 November 2013 to replace Giuseppe Sannino. He guided Chievo to maintain Serie A status by the end of the season and was thus confirmed as head coach, but was successively sacked on 19 October following a 0–3 defeat to Roma that left his club with four points in seven games.

On 30 November 2016, Corini was appointed manager of Palermo. He resigned on 24 January 2017.

On 4 February 2018, he was fired as manager of Novara.

He returned into management on 18 September 2018, by being named new head coach of Brescia, his first club as a player, in place of David Suazo. He was sacked on 3 November 2019. He was rehired by Brescia on 2 December 2019. On 5 February 2020, he was dismissed by Brescia once more. He became head coach of Serie B club Lecce on 22 August 2020. After Lecce failed to gain promotion to Serie A at the end of the 2020–21 season by losing in the promotion play-offs, he was dismissed on 22 May 2021.

On 23 March 2022, Corini was announced as the new head coach of Serie B club Brescia, thus marking his return with the Rondinelle two years after his last stint in charge of the club. He guided Brescia to the promotion playoffs, where they were defeated by eventual winners Monza in the semifinals; on 14 June 2022, Corini parted ways with Brescia by mutual consent.

On 7 August 2022, Corini agreed to return to Palermo as head coach, signing a two-year contract with the newly-promoted Serie B club.

Career statistics

Club

Managerial statistics

Honours

Player
Palermo
Serie B: 2003–04

Individual
Serie A Top Assist-provider: 2001–02 (11 assists)

Manager
Brescia
Serie B: 2018–19

References

External links

Player profile (from US Palermo official website)

Living people
1970 births
Sportspeople from the Province of Brescia
Association football midfielders
Italian footballers
Italian football managers
Brescia Calcio players
Juventus F.C. players
U.C. Sampdoria players
S.S.C. Napoli players
Piacenza Calcio 1919 players
Hellas Verona F.C. players
A.C. ChievoVerona players
Palermo F.C. players
Torino F.C. players
F.C. Crotone managers
Frosinone Calcio managers
A.C. ChievoVerona managers
Palermo F.C. managers
Novara F.C. managers
Brescia Calcio managers
U.S. Lecce managers
Olympic footballers of Italy
Footballers at the 1992 Summer Olympics
Serie A players
Serie B players
Italy under-21 international footballers
Serie A managers
Serie B managers
Footballers from Lombardy